Thea Noeliva LaFond (born April 5, 1994) is a triple jumper from Dominica.

Career
She competed at the 2016 Summer Olympics in the women's triple jump; her result of 12.82 meters in the qualifying round did not qualify her for the final. She was also selected to represent Dominica at the 2018 Commonwealth Games.

During the 2022 Commonwealth Games, she improved her result and achieved a Silver Medal in the women's triple jump event.

During the 2018 Commonwealth Games, she created history for becoming the first Dominican athlete to win a medal for Dominica at the Commonwealth Games after securing a bronze medal in the women's triple jump event.

She competed at the 2020 Summer Olympics.

References

External links 

 
 
 

1994 births
Living people
Dominica triple jumpers
Dominica female athletes
Olympic athletes of Dominica
Commonwealth Games medallists in athletics
Commonwealth Games bronze medallists for Dominica
Athletes (track and field) at the 2016 Summer Olympics
Athletes (track and field) at the 2018 Commonwealth Games
People from Roseau
Athletes (track and field) at the 2019 Pan American Games
Pan American Games competitors for Dominica
Athletes (track and field) at the 2020 Summer Olympics
Athletes (track and field) at the 2015 Pan American Games
Medallists at the 2018 Commonwealth Games